Elaeagnus macrophylla, the broad-leaved oleaster, is a species of flowering plant native to eastern Asia.

Heavily fragrant cream flowers in autumn are followed by red fruit in spring.

Elaeagnus × submacrophylla, formerly known as Elaeagnus × ebbingei, is a hybrid between E. macrophylla and E. pungens. The hybrid and its  cultivars are grown in gardens as ornamental plants.

References

Flora of Asia
macrophylla